Babylon.js is a real time 3D engine using a JavaScript library for displaying 3D graphics in a web browser via HTML5. The source code is available on GitHub and distributed under the Apache License 2.0.

History and progress 
It was initially released in 2013 under Microsoft Public License having been developed by two Microsoft employees. David Catuhe created the 3D game engine and was helped by David Rousset (VR, Gamepad and IndexedDB support) mostly in their free time as a side-project. They were also helped by artist Michel Rousseau who contributed several 3D scenes. It is based on an earlier game engine for Silverlight's WPF based 3D system.
Catuhe's side-project then became his full-time job, and his team's primary focus.
In 2015, it was presented at the WebGL Conference in Paris. As of 2018, it has more than 190 contributors and following its promotion and application in games, including one by Ubisoft. Its use has developed into a variety of fields such as:

 blockchain worlds
 crime data visualization
 education in medicine
 fashion avatars
 managing Kinect on the web
 military training
 modelling historic sites
 Product design
 RDF graphs
 urban underground infrastructure modelling

Technical description
The source code is written in TypeScript and then compiled into a JavaScript version. The JavaScript version is available to end users via NPM or CDN who then code their projects in JavaScript accessing the engine's API. The Babylon.js 3D engine and user code is natively interpreted by all the web browser supporting the HTML5 standard and WebGL to undertake the 3D rendering.

Modeling methodology
The 3D modeling process used is that of polygon modeling with triangular faces to be represented by shell models. Limited use of constructive solid geometry is possible though only as a transitional method to create the union, subtraction and intersection of shell models. Once created models are rendered on an HTML 5 canvas element using a shader program which determines the pixel positions and colors on the canvas using the polygon models, the textures applied to each model, the scene camera and lights together with the 4 x 4 world matrices for each object which stores their position, rotation and scale. The technique used to produce photo realistic images is that of physically based rendering along with post-processing methods. In order to simulate collisions between models and other real world physical actions one of two physics engines need to be added as plugins, these are Cannon.js and Oimo. Animation involving, for example, changes in position or color of models is accomplished by key frame animation objects called animatables, while full character animation is achieved through the use of skeletons with blend weights.

See also

List of 3D graphics libraries
JavaScript library
Web framework

References

Further reading

External links
 

2013 software
3D scenegraph APIs
Cross-platform software
Free 3D graphics software
Graphics libraries
JavaScript libraries
Microsoft free software
Software using the Apache license
WebGL